S vetrom uz lice is the third studio album by the Serbian rock band Ekatarina Velika, released in 1986. With this album Ekatarina Velika reached a wider audience, and it is considered to be the commercial breakthrough for the band. The new drummer, replacing Ivan "Firchie" Fece, was Ivan "Raka" Ranković (ex. Tvrdo srce i velike uši). The album was recorded and mixed in SIM studio in Zagreb and produced by Dragan Čačinović and Ekatarina Velika.

In 2006 "Ti si sav moj bol" was ranked #3 on the B92 Top 100 Domestic Songs list.

Track listing

Personnel

Milan Mladenović – vocals, guitar
Margita Stefanović – piano, keyboards, backing vocals
Bojan Pečar – bass
Ivan "Raka" Ranković – drums

External links

 

Ekatarina Velika albums
1986 albums
ZKP RTLJ albums